Tom Denney (born November 23, 1982) is an American musician and record producer. He is a founding member and the ex-lead guitarist of A Day to Remember. He has since parted ways with the band and now produces at his own recording studio (though he was involved with the band's writing sessions for three more of their albums).

He continues to write and produce music for various other bands, with Secrets (post-hardcore band) being one of his main projects.

Tom’s current band is Sounds Like Color, with Jesse Smarslok on vocals.

History

Early years and A Day to Remember (1992–2009)

Tom Denney started playing guitar from the age of 10. Denney was later in a band called 2 Days 2 Late with drummer Bobby Scruggs; Denney called vocalist Jeremy McKinnon (who was in another band at the time) asking if he wanted to form another band, later called A Day to Remember. Denney performed on the band's first three albums: And Their Name Was Treason (2005), For Those Who Have Heart (2007), and Homesick (2009). Denney has stated that Nirvana was a major influence on him, adding that "if it wasn't for Nirvana, I honestly wouldn't be here". Other inspirations include country music artists such as George Jones and Johnny Cash.

On June 2, 2009, the band announced that Denney had left the group; and was replaced by Four Letter Lie guitarist Kevin Skaff. The band stated that Denney left because he wants to focus on his marriage, a family, and his recording studio. Regardless of his departure from the band, he still remained a part of the writing process of new material. Denney has since contributed music to a number of the band's albums: What Separates Me from You (2010), Common Courtesy (2013), and Bad Vibrations (2016).

Record producer and solo career (2007–present)
Brian Calzini, a friend of Denney's, stopped by Denney's Titan Studio, while he was working on a song. Calzini asked whether he could overdub vocals to it: "we stayed up all night fucking around on this song and I just randomly made up lyrics to it as I went. The song had a very nu-metal singing part so Tom sang on it to be funny. The song was a complete joke just for fun". Later that night after the session had finished, Calzini took the track home with him, and put it on MySpace, titling it "I'll Swing My Fists". After changing the name of his MySpace account, due to the growing number of plays of the song, to Boston B; the pair soon recorded several tracks that Denney had left unused to which Calzini added lyrics to. Calzini gathered a group of people to pose as a band, and to record music with, at Denney's studio; naming the group as Paddock Park and releasing the songs on With False Hope EP (2007). All the songs featured on the EP were later re-recorded in August 2008, with Denney producing, with some new songs to make it a full-length album.

On July 26, 2011, it was announced that Denney would be releasing a solo EP in the fall of that year on his own record label, 33 Records. A short preview of one song, rap song "I'm Gangsta", was released on the same day. The song was later released as a single on October 25; the music video of which had its premiere via Alternative Press' APTV, on November 1. Band Mest released a single on June 4, 2013, "Radio (Something to Believe)", which was co-written with Denney and features McKinnon as a guest musician. It was also produced by Denney.

Discography
Solo
Ima Monster (EP, 2011)

With A Day to Remember

As a composer and guitarist
 And Their Name Was Treason (2005)
 For Those Who Have Heart (2007)
 Homesick (2009)
As a composer only
 What Separates Me from You (2010)
 Common Courtesy (2013)
 Bad Vibrations (2016)

Production discography

Notes

References

1982 births
Living people
Musicians from Ocala, Florida
A Day to Remember
Pierce the Veil
Guitarists from Florida

External Links
Official website
Stateside Management profile